Kokri Behniwal is a village in the Moga District of Punjab, India.  It lies about 7 km from the Ludhiana-Ferozepur Grand Trunk Road, near Ajitwal.

See also 
Kokri Buttran
Buttar Kalan

References 

Moga, Punjab
Villages in Moga district